Zanna madagascariensis, the Malagasy lantern bug, is endemic to Madagascar. It is a member of the Zanninae, considered to be a subfamily of the Fulgoridae. The nymphs are sometimes referred to as lantern-flies because of their large lantern like snout, although this does not emit light. The adult bugs are known as sakandry, and are consumed by the rural people of Madagascar. Roasted whole, they are reported to taste like bacon.

Description
Zanna madagascariensis has a white waxy dusty defensive coating and a large orange lantern-like head or snout.

References

Endemic fauna of Madagascar
Insects of Madagascar
Insects described in 1860
Edible insects
Fulgorinae